MV Rachel Corrie is a 499 GT coaster owned and operated by the Free Gaza Movement. The ship is named in honour of Rachel Corrie, a deceased member of the International Solidarity Movement. Built by J.J. Sietas in Hamburg in 1967, she was originally named Carsten; she has also carried the names Norasia Attika, Manya and Linda.

In June 2010 the vessel was intercepted by Israeli Defence Forces while attempting to break the Israeli blockade of the Gaza Strip and to deliver humanitarian aid.

Description
The ship was built as yard number 625 by J J Sietas, Germany.

History

Early history
Originally named Carsten, she was sold in 1993 to P Buck, Antigua and renamed Norasia Attika. She was sold on 8 December that year to Ariadna Shipping Ltd, St Vincent. On 1 February 1994 she was placed under the management of H Möller KG, Germany. She was renamed Manya on 24 November 2000. On 23 February 2004 she was sold to Hanza Bunkering Ltd. She was renamed Linda on 24 November 2003. On 30 August 2005 she was sold to Lackner Ventures Ltd. On 28 November 2005, she was placed under the management of Eestinova.

Linda was used by Guinness for exporting beer before being converted for use as a freighter. Her port of registry was Phnom Penh. The IMO Number 6715281 and MMSI Number 515886000 are allocated. Rachel Corrie uses the Callsign XUJW8.

1999–2009
By 2009, the ship had been bringing timber into Dundalk, Ireland from the Baltic for the previous 10 years. At the end of July that year, the Cambodian-registered vessel and its crew were abandoned by its owners, Forestry Shipping, of Riga, a company which has gone out of business. The crew were left with one day's food and were owed arrears of pay that totaled €42,000. With the assistance of the Irish union SIPTU, an affiliate of the International Transport Workers' Federation (ITF), they were repatriated to their home countries in November 2009.

2009–present
After being seized by the High Court on behalf of the ITF, the ship was sold at auction in Dundalk for €70,000 to the Free Gaza Movement on 30 March 2010. This enabled ITF Inspector Ken Fleming to pay the crew their arrears. It was outfitted at Brown's Quay in Dundalk, Ireland, for use in a voyage to Gaza. While there, a significant amount of navigational equipment worth between €15,000 and €20,000 was stolen from the vessel.

The ship was renamed in honor of Rachel Corrie, an American college student crushed to death by an Israeli army bulldozer while trying to prevent a house demolition in Gaza.
The vessel was launched on 12 May 2010 from Dundalk with the full title MV Rachel Corrie.

2010 Gaza journey

MV Rachel Corrie had intended to sail with the six ships of the Gaza Freedom Flotilla, but was unable to join the other ships because of mechanical problems that forced it to undergo repairs in Malta, possibly resulting from Israeli sabotage. The other six ships were confronted by a raid on 30 May 2010. In the violent clashes that followed, nine Turkish activists were killed and several dozen activists and ten IDF soldiers were injured.

The ship got underway on 31 May 2010, with her crew insisting that they would go to Gaza.

References

External links

1967 ships
Ships built in Hamburg
Merchant ships of Antigua and Barbuda
Merchant ships of Saint Vincent and the Grenadines
Merchant ships of Latvia
Merchant ships of Cambodia
Gaza flotilla raid
Rachel Corrie
Ireland–Israel relations
Maritime incidents in Israel
Maritime incidents in 2010